Cassida piperata is a species of beetle in the leaf beetle family. It is native to eastern Asia, but it has also been reported from the United States as an alien species.

Description
The females are bigger than males.

References

Beetles described in 1842
Cassidinae